Alexandre Tharaud (born 9 December 1968) is a French pianist. He is active on the concert stage and has released a large and diverse discography.

Life and career

Born in Paris, Tharaud discovered the music scene through his mother who was a dance teacher at the Opéra de Paris, and his father, an amateur director and singer of operettas. Tharaud thus appeared as a child in theatres around northern France, where the family spent many weekends. His grandfather was a violinist in Paris in the 1920s and 1930s.
At the initiative of his parents, Alexandre started his piano studies at the age of five, and he entered Conservatory of the 14th Arrondissement, where his teacher was Carmen Taccon-Devenat, a student of Marguerite Long.

He entered the Conservatoire de Paris at the age of 14 where he won first prize for piano in the class of Germaine Mounier when he was 17 years old. With Theodor Paraskivesco, he mastered the piano, and he sought and received advice from Claude Helffer, Leon Fleisher and Nikita Magaloff. In 1987, he won third prize at the Maria Canals International Competition in Barcelona and, a year later, the Senigallia Competition in Italy. In 1989, he was awarded 2nd prize at the ARD International Music Competition in Munich. His career developed quickly in Europe as well as in North America and Japan.

In 2009, he took part in a show devoted to Erik Satie with actor François Morel. Alongside the singer Juliette, he organised a Satie Day at the Cité de la musique, recorded for France Télévisions. He has also worked with the French composer Thierry Pécou, performing the première of his first piano concerto in October 2006 at the Théâtre des Champs-Élysées and later recording it.

In 2012, Tharaud took part in the French film Amour by Michael Haneke where he played himself, alongside Jean-Louis Trintignant, Emmanuelle Riva and Isabelle Huppert, although he said that it would not be the start of a film career for him.

The New York Times described his Bach playing at a recital in 2005 as "crisply articulated and vividly etched".

In 2015 Tharaud starred as the central performer at the Prinsengrachtconcert in Amsterdam.

Following Piano intime: conversations avec Nicolas Southon (Philippe Rey, 2013), in 2017 Tharaud published a second book entitled Montrez-moi vos mains (Show me your hands) (Grasset, 2017), in which he recounts his career, methods of working, relationships with colleagues, variations in audiences around the world, and his personal feelings about a musician's life.

Method of work
Tharaud refuses to keep a piano in his residence because he believes he would begin to prefer the pleasure of improvisation to the necessity of rigorous work. He practices on different instruments at friends' residences. He composes, but usually privately. Before each recording he lays flowers at the tomb of Emmanuel Chabrier at Montparnasse Cemetery. When asked what a camera would record at his recording sessions, he replied that he sings, shouts, dances, and argues with the piano ("absurd behaviour"—comportements ridicules).

Awards
 Commander of the Order of Arts and Letters (2016)

Discography
 Bach, Italian Concertos, Harmonia Mundi, 2005
 Bach, Keyboard concertos, Virgin Classics, 2011
 Emmanuel Chabrier, Complete works for piano, Arion, 2007
 Chopin, Préludes opus 28, Harmonia Mundi, 2008
 Chopin, Journal intime, Virgin Classics, 2009
 Chopin, Intégrale des valses, Harmonia Mundi, 2010
 Couperin, Tic toc choc, Harmonia Mundi, 2007
 Grieg, Lyric pieces, Disques Dante, 1993
 Kagel, Æon, 2003 ; re-issued, Rewind, 2012
 Milhaud, Saudades do Brazil, La muse ménagère, L'album de Madame Bovary (with Madeleine Milhaud), Naxos
 Thierry Pécou, Outre-mémoire, with the ensemble Zellig, Æon
 Thierry Pécou, l'Oiseau innumérable, Harmonia Mundi, 2008
 Poulenc, survey of the chamber music (Sextet, Sonatas with piano for oboe, flute, violin, clarinet, cello), Trio for Oboe, Bassoon and Piano, works for two pianos and piano four hands, Le Bal masqué (with Franck Leguérinel, baritone), L'histoire de Babar (French version with François Mouzaya; English version with Natasha Emerson), L'Invitation au Château and Léocadia (with Danielle Darrieux)) for Naxos France
 Poulenc, Debussy, Complete works for cello and piano, with Jean-Guihen Queyras, Harmonia Mundi, 2008
 Poulenc, Pièces pour piano, Arion, 2008
 Rameau, Suites en la et en sol, Harmonia Mundi, 2001
 Ravel, Complete works for piano, Harmonia Mundi, 2003
 Satie, Avant-dernières pensées, Harmonia Mundi, 2009
 Scarlatti, Alexandre Tharaud plays Scarlatti, Virgin Classics, 2011
 Franz Schubert, Moments Musicaux, Sonatas D. 664 and D. 783, Arion, 2000
 Schubert, Divertissement à la hongroise, with Zhu Xiao-Mei, Harmonia Mundi, 2003
 Schubert, Arpeggione Sonata, with Jean-Guihen Queyras, Harmonia Mundi, 2006
 Schubert, complete works for piano four-hands, with Zhu Xiao-Mei
 Autograph (2013)
 Boulez, Messiaen, Jolivet, Dutilleux, Varèse, Musique du XXe pour flûte et piano, with Philippe Bernold, Harmonia Mundi, 2008
 Soundtrack of the film Amour (film of Michael Haneke). Franz Schubert, Beethoven, Bach. Virgin Classics, 2012
 Milhaud, Le Bœuf sur le toit. With Juliette, Madeleine Peyroux, Natalie Dessay, Bénabar, Guillaume Gallienne, Jean Delescluse, Frank Braley. Virgin Classics, 2012

Filmography 

 2012: Amour - Himself
 2015 : Bach Goldberg Variations directed by Stéphan Aubé, Erato

Books 
 Piano intime: conversations avec Nicolas Southon (Philippe Rey, 2013) 
 Montrez-moi vos mains (Grasset, 2017)

References

Sources
 Interview dans Télérama, Number 3083: 11 February 2009, pp. 14 to 16.

External links 
 
 Two interviews with Alexandre Tharaud

Living people
20th-century French male classical pianists
1968 births
Musicians from Paris
Commandeurs of the Ordre des Arts et des Lettres
21st-century French male classical pianists
Harmonia Mundi artists
Erato Records artists
Conservatoire de Paris alumni
Prize-winners of the ARD International Music Competition